Sylvia Webster Jefferies (born August 14, 1969) is an American actress, best known for her recurring role as Jolene Barnes in the ABC drama series  Nashville .

Life and career
Jefferies was born in Greenwood, South Carolina. She is the daughter of the late James Jefferies, a lawyer and former mayor of Greenwood, and Polly Jefferies, a retired emergency room registered nurse. She attended the American Academy of Dramatic Arts in New York and in  following years appeared in stage production and television commercials.

Jefferies is known for her recurring role as Tracy on the HBO comedy series Eastbound & Down (2009-2010). In 2012, Jefferies was cast in recurring role in the ABC drama series Nashville created by Academy Award winner Callie Khouri. She played Jolene Barnes, mother of Hayden Panettiere's character, who is a drug addict. She also appeared in films The Notebook, Halloween II, 96 Minutes, Rob Zombie’s 3 from Hell, and guest starred on One Tree Hill and Surface.

Filmography

Film

Television

References

External links
 
 

1969 births
American film actresses
American television actresses
Living people
American Academy of Dramatic Arts alumni
People from Greenwood, South Carolina
Actresses from South Carolina
21st-century American actresses